"Wulf and Eadwacer"  (approximately ) is an Old English poem of famously difficult interpretation. It has been variously characterised, (modernly) as an elegy, (historically) as a riddle, and (in speculation on the poem's pre-history) as a song or ballad with refrain. The poem is narrated in the first person, most likely by female speaker. Because the audience is given so little information about her situation, some scholars argue the story was well-known, and that the unnamed speaker corresponds, for example, to Signý or that the characters Wulf and Eadwacer correspond to Theoderic the Great and his rival Odoacer. The poem's only extant text is found at folios 100v-101r in the tenth-century Exeter Book, alongside certain other texts to which it possesses qualitative similarities.

Synopsis

The speaker of the poem is arguably separated from her lover and/or husband, Wulf, both symbolically and materially ('Wulf is on iege, ic on oþerre' [Wulf is on an island, I on another]), and this separation is seemingly maintained by threat of violence ('willað hy hine aþecgan' [they will want to ?seize him]), possibly by her own people ('Leodum is minum swylce him mon lac gife' [it is to my people as though someone will give him/them a gift/sacrifice]). Crying out in her sorrow for her lover, she longs for him to take her in his arms ('þonne mec se beaducafa bogum bilegde' [then/when the battle-bold one laid his arms around me]). She finds comfort in his coming, but it is also bittersweet ('wæs me wyn to þon, wæs me hwæþre eac lað' [there was joy to me in that; it was also hateful to me]). She then addresses 'Eadwacer', who may be her husband or her captor, and she appears to identify their 'whelp' ('Uncerne earne hwelp' [our wretched whelp]), generally understood to metaphorically imply 'child' and possibly a reference to the child's being the 'whelp' of a man named 'Wulf'. She describes this child as being taken off 'to the woods' (to wuda).

Text and translation
In Wulf and Eadwacer there is a significant number of words which are obscure in meaning (e.g. aþecgan, dogode, and þreat). The rest of its vocabulary, while appearing straightforward, may be unclear as to precise meaning, or even deliberately ambiguous. This provides a problem for translators. The following translation is by Elaine Treharne:

One scholarly translation that tries to indicate most of the ambiguities in the text is the following:

Characters
The most conventional interpretation of the poem is as a lament spoken in the first person by an unnamed woman who is or has in the past been involved with two men whose names are Wulf and Eadwacer respectively. Both of these are attested Anglo-Saxon names, and this interpretation is the basis for the common titling of the poem (which is not based on any other manuscript evidence). However, even this point proves controversial. Some interpretations favour a single male character, and virtually all commentaries acknowledge the possibility, though this is the less orthodox of the two views. In recognition of this fact, for example, preeminent Old English scholar Michael Alexander has chosen the title "Wulf" for his own reproduction of it in The Earliest English Poems (Penguin, 1973). It has also been known to be titled simply as Eadwacer. The title Wulf and Eadwacer, however, though editorial, has gained such widespread acceptance over time that in the majority of texts it is accepted regardless of the treatment of the titular name(s) and character(s).

Genre

For lack of any historical evidence or attestation outside the Exeter Book's text, historical criticism is limited to study of the Exeter Book itself and, particularly, to comparative study of its various contained works. Though it is generally held that the poem's composition occurred at a date significantly earlier than the date of the Exeter Book's own compilation, the degree of the poem's age relative to the codex is difficult if not impossible to ascertain. The dating of the poem in criticism is thus generally limited to what can be ascertained from the known history of the Exeter Book, for which suggested dates of compilation range from 960CE to 990CE. Though the folios on which the poem is recorded are not subject to any significant damage necessitating reconstruction, its textual problems and, particularly, the grammatical confusion of the first lines of the text, have resulted in widespread postulation that the initial lines of the poem may have been lost prior to its inclusion in the Exeter Book but subsequent to an earlier transcription. However, there is no manuscript evidence to directly support this theory. The characterization of the poem as a riddle is the oldest of its various treatments, the argument for which characterization is based largely upon the obscurity of its subject and the placement of the poem within the Exeter Book, where it was included as Riddle I in Benjamin Thorpe's 1842 translation of the Exeter Book. Additionally, Thorpe left Wulf and Eadwacer untranslated, and he notes "Of this, I can make no sense, nor am I able to arrange the verses". However, its length and its various textual problems not characteristic of the riddles have led few scholars to pursue a simple riddle interpretation in modern textual study, and few such explanations have garnered serious attention in the recent history of its scholarship. Rather, the thematic similarity of the poem to The Wife's Lament, also found in the Exeter Book, has caused most modern scholars to place it, along with the Wife's Lament, solidly within the genre of the Frauenlied, or woman's song and, more broadly, in that of the Old English elegy. These two poems are also used as examples of the female voice in broadening early feminist literary history. However, Wulf and Eadwacer's adjacency to the riddles has continued to inform commentary and interpretation.

Manuscript evidence

Proposals regarding its heritage prior to inscription in the Exeter codex are consequently many and various. The inclusion of a refrain in the text of the poem may support an originally non-English origin, as the refrain is not conventional to the Old English elegy or to any other known Old English poetical form. Among proposed explanations for this anomaly, a Scandinavian inspiration for the Anglo-Saxon text offers one possible solution to this problem, and has similarly been considered as an explanation for its difficult language, but this theory, as with most others on the poem's prehistory, can only be regarded as hypothetical given lack of substantive corroborating evidence. The suggestion is that the poem derives from some interpretation of the Wayland story; that the woman is Beadohilde, Wulf is Wayland, and Eadwacer her angry father. This episode is also discussed in the poem Deor.

Differing interpretations 
Even though the poem is a mere nineteen lines there are many differing interpretations, not least because the poem contains several obscure words and some ambiguous grammar. One interpreter considers that the word Eadwacer in the poem is not a proper noun, but a simple common noun which means "property watcher". This brings the characters in the poem from three to two, the speaker and her lover, Wulf. If one adopts this interpretation then her exclamation ("Do you hear me, Eadwacer?") could be meant to be sarcastic or a calling out of his manhood. She is saying that his long absences have made him anything but a protector to her and their child whom she worries about. Using this interpretation, the speaker's use of irony when speaking of her lover makes the last two lines make sense. The speaker may be saying that Wulf has been her lover and her child's father, but has never treated her as or actually been her husband. Therefore, the complications of their relationship is easily unbound. However, this seems to be more easily done by Wulf than the speaker herself (Adams).

While debatable among scholars, some argue the character of Wulf is the speaker's child and not her lover. In this instance, she could be lamenting after her son, hoping that he was okay, or mourning his death. One scholar says:In Wulf and Eadwacer a woman finds herself in a situation typical of Old English poetry, torn between conflicting loyalties. Many commentators see this particular situation as a sexual triangle, with Wulf the woman’s lover and Eadwacer her husband. If so, then Wulf and Eadwacer is not typical, because most Old English loyalty crises occur within the family group…It is…true that romantic or sexual love was not the literary commonplace before the twelfth century it has been since; other loves took precedence…The situation in Wulf and Eadwacer is far more typically Anglo-Saxon than as usually interpreted, if the speaker is understood to be the mother of the person she addresses as Wulf, as well as of the 'whelp' of line 16.His argument that Wulf is actually the narrator’s son gives a different depth to the elegy—it becomes a poem of mourning for her son that seems to be exiled or dead.

Translations and adaptations

Verse translations and adaptations 
 'Wulf', by Kevin Crossley-Holland, published in The Battle of Maldon and Other Old English Poems (1965).
 'Wulf and Eadwacer', by Michael Alexander, published in The Earliest English Poems (1966).
 Craig Raine, in Rich (London: Faber, 1984), p. 27.
 'Wulf and Eadwacer', by Fiona Sampson, published in Folding the Real (2001).
 'Love's Medium', by Bernard O'Donoghue, published in Outliving (2003) to celebrate the marriage of two of his ex-students, Elanor Dymott and Simon Marshall.
 'Wulf and Eadwacer', by Paul Muldoon, published in The Word Exchange: Anglo-Saxon Poems in Translation (2010).
 'Four Departures from Wulf and Eadwacer', by Vahni Capildeo, first published in Utter (2013).
 'Wulf and Eadwacer/Daylight is Our Evidence', by Kerry Carnahan, published in the Boston Review (2017). Carnahan uses the poem to explore the terror of white nationalism and violence against women. 
'Wulf and Eadwacer', by Miller Wolf Oberman, published in The Unstill Ones (Princeton: Princeton University Press, 2017), pp. 6-8 and 57 .
'From WULF', by Rowan Evans, published in Reliquiæ (2017). 
M. L. Martin, W & E (Action Books, forthcoming), with excerpts published in several journals, including Waxwing (2018), Brooklyn Rail : In Translation (August 2018), and Columbia Journal (2019).

Novels and short stories 
 Wulf by Hamish Clayton, published by Penguin New Zealand (2011). Wulf tells the story of 'Wulf and Eadwacer' interwoven with that of Ngāti Toa chief Te Rauparaha.
 The poem is featured heavily in After Me Comes the Flood by Sarah Perry (2014), reflecting the book’s themes of impenetrability, loneliness and love.

Music 
 'Wulf and Eadwacer' by American neofolk band Blood Axis, released on their album Born Again (2010).

References

Sources
Adams, John F. "Wulf and Eadwacer: An Interpretation." Modern Language Notes 73.1 (1958): 1-5.
Alexander, Michael. "Wulf." The Earliest English Poems. London: Penguin, 1973. p. 56-62.
Baker, Peter S. "Wulf and Eadwacer: A Classroom Edition." Old English Newsletter 16.2 (1983): 179-180.
Baker, Peter S.  "Wulf and Eadwacer."  Introduction to Old English.  Oxford: Blackwell, 2003.  p. 206-207.
Mitchell, Bruce.  "Wulf."  An Invitation to Old English & Anglo-Saxon England.  Oxford: Blackwell, 1997. p. 308-309.
Mitchell, Bruce and Robinson, Fred C.  "Wulf and Eadwacer."  A Guide to Old English. 6th ed.  Oxford: Blackwell, 2001. p. 297-299.
Treharne, Elaine, ed.  "Wulf and Eadwacer."  Old English and Middle English c.890-c.1400.  2nd ed.  Oxford: Blackwell, 2001.  p. 64-65.

External links
Wulf & Eadwacer, an experimental translation of the Anglo-Saxon poem
A Modern English translation with translator's footnotes
An attempt at a poetic translation, with commentary
Another English translation

Old English poems